Aq Mashhad (also Romanized as Āq Mashhad; also known as Āqā Mashhad) is a village in Tangeh Soleyman Rural District, Kolijan Rostaq District, Sari County, Mazandaran Province, Iran. At the 2006 census, its population was 193, in 73 families.

References 

Populated places in Sari County